Tyning's Barrow Swallet is a cave between Charterhouse and Shipham in the limestone of the Mendip Hills, in Somerset, England. The cave is close to GB Cave and also to Charterhouse Cave, the deepest cave in the region.

Access 
The entrance is kept locked, and the key is available from the nearby farmhouse on payment of small goodwill fee.

See also 
 Caves of the Mendip Hills

References 

Caves of the Mendip Hills
Limestone caves
Cheddar, Somerset